The 1913–14 team finished with a record of 8–4. It was the 2nd and last year for head coach LeRoy Brown. The team captain was Elton Rynearson.

Schedule

|-
!colspan=9 style="background:#006633; color:#FFFFFF;"| Non-conference regular season

1. EMU shows 37-28 and UDM shows 34-28.

2. EMU shows 18-42 and UDM shows 17-41.

3. EMU shows 38-38 and CMU shows 39-38.

References

Eastern Michigan Eagles men's basketball seasons
Michigan State Normal